The 1900–01 Football League season was Aston Villa's 13th season in the Football League First Division, the top flight of English football at the time. The season fell in what was to be called Villa's golden era. During the season Jimmy Crabtree, Jack Devey, and Howard Spencer shared the captaincy of the club. Billy Garraty, great-great grandfather of Jack Grealish, made the most appearances during the season. Goalkeeper & first-class cricketer, Billy George was next with 39 appearances.

On 1 December 1900, Villa recorded the biggest home win	in the League that season, 7–1  against Manchester City in front of a crowd of 12,000. When Aston Villa played away at Stoke on 29 December 1900, the home club registered its biggest home attendance of the season.

Football League

First team squad
  Billy Garraty, 41 appearances
  Billy George, 39 appearances, conceded 27
  Steve Smith, 36 appearances
  Jack Devey, 33 appearances
  Albert Evans, 33 appearances
  Jimmy Cowan, 30 appearances
  Charlie Athersmith, 32 appearances
  Howard Spencer, 21 appearances
  Jimmy Crabtree, 32 appearances
  Tommy Bowman, 31 appearances
  George Johnson, 25 appearances
  Charlie Aston, 6 appearances
  Albert Wilkes, 31 appearances
  Bobby Templeton, 20 appearances
  Chris Mann, 3 appearances
  Micky Noon, 13 appearances
Willie McAuley, 6 appearances
  Joe Pearson, 6 appearances
  Albert Brown, 2 appearances
  Joe Bache, 7 appearances
  Frank Lloyd, 3 appearances
  Alf Wood, 4 appearances
  Jimmy Murray, 1 appearance
Tom Gilson, 2 appearances
  Jack Whitley, 3 appearances, conceded 10 
  Tommy Wilson, 1 appearance
  Arthur Millar, 1 appearance

References

Aston Villa F.C. seasons
Aston Villa